The Stang's Second Cabinet governed Norway between 2 May 1893 and 14 October 1895. It had the following composition:

Cabinet members

State Secretary
Not to be confused with the modern title State Secretary. The old title State Secretary, used between 1814 and 1925, is now known as Secretary to the Government (Regjeringsråd).

Halfdan Lehmann

References
Emil Stang's Second Government. 2 May 1893 - 14 October 1895 - Government.no

Notes

Stang 2
Stang 2
1893 establishments in Norway
1895 disestablishments in Norway
Cabinets established in 1893
Cabinets disestablished in 1895